Guestling is a village and civil parish in the Rother district of East Sussex, England. Its parish church is dedicated to St Laurence.

History
Guestling, referred to in the Domesday Book (1086) as Gestelinges, was originally named as a settlement of the family of a man named Gyrstel. The Domesday entry records that the village consisted in 1086 of 21 households, 14 villagers and 7 cottagers.

In 1542, Gregory Martin was born in Guestling and went on to do the majority of the translation for the Douay–Rheims Bible, the first full official Catholic English Bible translation. In 1896, hand made bricks were first produced in Guestling, which would go on to be used in Royal locations such as Buckingham Palace and Hampton Court.

In June 2017, Brian Bellhouse was trampled to death by a herd of cows in a field at Church Lane, Guestling.

Geography
The hamlet of Three Oaks also lies within the parish.

Landmarks and culture 
The village was probably originally centred around the St Laurence's Church, built in the 11th century: the building has a Norman tower which has been Grade I listed since 1961. However, the villagers moved further away from the church, possibly owing to victims of the Black Death being buried in the churchyard. Also buried in the graveyard was Olive "Nou" Rand Brockwell, nanny of Christopher Robin Milne. The church was restored in 1886, but was further damaged by a fire in 1890. The village's war memorials are located within the church, with 24 names from the First World War and 8 from the Second World War. There has been an annual Flower Festival since the 1990s at St Laurence's Church.

The school in the village is the Guestling-Bradshaw CE Primary School, which dates back to 1835.

References

Civil parishes in East Sussex
Rother District